Soukup (feminine Soukupová) is a Czech occupational surname, denoting a person involved in trade. Notable people include:

 Aneta Soukup (born 1978), Canadian tennis player
 Dennis Soukup, American United States Navy submariner and mathematics teacher
 Hana Soukupová, Czech model
 Irena Soukupová, Czech rower
 Jan Soukup, Czech karateka and kickboxer
 Janay DeLoach Soukup, American athlete
 Jaroslav Soukup, Czech biathlete
 Jaroslav Soukup (director), Czech film director and producer
 Martha Soukup, American writer
 Matthew Soukup, Canadian ski jumper
 Miroslav Soukup, Czech football manager
 Ondřej Soukup, Czech composer
 Petra Soukupová, Czech author
 Věra Soukupová, Czech opera singer
 Vladimír Soukup, Czech classical composer

See also
 

Czech-language surnames
Occupational surnames